Oya  is a common feminine Turkish given name. In Turkish, "Oya" means "lace", "Irish lace", and/or "lagestromia indica".

Ōya, also spelled Ohya or Oya, is a Japanese surname. In Japanese, the meaning of the name depends on the kanji used to write it; some ways of writing the name include  "big arrow", "big house" (or ), and "big valley".

People

Given name
 Oya Araslı, a Turkish law scholar and politician, and first woman group deputy chairman of Turkey
 Oya Aydoğan, Turkish actress
 Oya Başar, Turkish comedy actress
 Oya Baydar (born 1940), Turkish sociologist and writer
 Oya Eczacıbaşı (born 1959), Turkish museum director
 Oya Kayacık (1938–2020), Turkish philanthropist
 , Turkish singer, actress and voice artist
 , Turkish academic, one of the founders of communication sciences in Turkey
 Oya Tuzcuoğlu (born 1948), Turkish diplomat
 , Turkish actress
 , Turkish award-winning poet

Surname
 Arif Oya, one of the governors of Alanya
 , a Turkish actor, theatre director, theatre writer
 Bruno O'Ya (1933–2002), Polish–Estonian actor
 Goichi Oya (died 1944), captain in the Imperial Japanese Navy 
 , Japanese wrestler
 José Oya (born 1983), Spanish footballer
 , Japanese model
 ,  Japanese runner
 , Japanese volleyball player
 , Japanese entrepreneur and politician
 , Japanese idol
 , Japanese journalist
 , Japanese footballer

Fictional characters
 Oya (comics), a character from Marvel Comics

References

Turkish feminine given names
Japanese-language surnames